Supernatural is an American dark fantasy drama television series created by Eric Kripke. It was first broadcast on September 13, 2005, on The WB, and subsequently became part of successor The CW's lineup. Starring Jared Padalecki as Sam Winchester and Jensen Ackles as Dean Winchester, the series follows the two brothers as they hunt demons, ghosts, monsters, and other supernatural beings. The series was produced by Warner Bros. Television, in association with Wonderland Sound and Vision. Along with Kripke, executive producers have been McG, Robert Singer, Phil Sgriccia, Sera Gamble, Jeremy Carver, John Shiban, Ben Edlund, and Adam Glass. Former executive producer and director Kim Manners died of lung cancer during production of the fourth season.

The series was filmed in Vancouver, British Columbia, and surrounding areas. It was in development for nearly ten years, as creator Kripke spent several years unsuccessfully pitching it. The pilot was viewed by an estimated 5.69 million viewers, and the ratings of the first four episodes prompted The WB to pick up the series for a full season. Kripke planned the series for three seasons but later expanded it to five. The fifth season concluded the series' main storyline, and Kripke departed the series as showrunner. The series continued on for 10 more seasons with new showrunners, including Sera Gamble, Jeremy Carver, Robert Singer and Andrew Dabb. With its eleventh season, Supernatural became the longest-running American live-action fantasy TV series. The series was renewed for a fifteenth and final season that consisted of 20 episodes, and premiered on October 10, 2019. The series concluded on November 19, 2020, with 327 episodes aired.

Production

Conception and creation 

Before bringing Supernatural to television, creator Eric Kripke had been developing the series for nearly ten years, having been fascinated with urban legends since he was a child. He had originally envisioned Supernatural as a movie. He later developed it as a TV series and spent a few years pitching it before it was picked up by The WB. The concept went through several phases before becoming the eventual product, shifting from the original idea of an anthology series to one of tabloid reporters driving around the country in a van "fighting the demons in search of the truth". Kripke wanted it to be a road trip series, feeling that it was the "best vehicle to tell these stories because it's pure, stripped down and uniquely American... These stories exist in these small towns all across the country, and it just makes so much sense to drive in and out of these stories."

As he had previously written for The WB series Tarzan, Kripke was offered the chance to pitch show ideas to the network and used the opportunity for Supernatural. However, the network disliked his tabloid reporter idea, so Kripke successfully pitched his last-minute idea of the characters being brothers. He decided to have the brothers be from Lawrence, Kansas, because of its closeness to Stull Cemetery, a location famous for its urban legends.

When it came time to name the two lead characters, Kripke decided on "Sal" and "Dean" as an homage to Jack Kerouac's road-trip novel On the Road. However, he felt that "Sal" was inappropriate for a main character and changed the name to "Sam". It was originally intended for the brothers' last name to be "Harrison" as a nod to actor Harrison Ford, as Kripke wanted Dean to have the "devil-may-care swagger of Han Solo". However, there was a Sam Harrison living in Kansas, so the name had to be changed for legal reasons. Combining his interest in the Winchester Mystery House and his desire to give the series the feel of "a modern-day Western", Kripke settled on the surname of "Winchester". However, this also presented a problem. The first name of Sam and Dean's father was originally Jack, but there was a Jack Winchester residing in Kansas, so Kripke was forced to change the character's name to John.

Growing up, Kripke connected to television shows that had signature cars, such as The Dukes of Hazzard and Knight Rider. This prompted him to include one in Supernatural. "We say it's a modern American Western – two gunslingers who ride into town, fight the bad guys, kiss the girl and ride out into the sunset again. And we were always talking from the very beginning that if you're going to have cowboys, they need a trusty horse." He originally intended for the car to be a '65 Mustang, but his neighbor convinced him to change it to a '67 Impala, since "you can put a body in the trunk" and because "you want a car that, when people stop next to it at the lights, they lock their doors." Kripke has commented, "It's a Rottweiler of a car, and I think it adds authenticity for fans of automobiles because of that, because it's not a pretty ride. It's an aggressive, muscular car, and I think that's what people respond to, and why it fits so well into the tone of our show."

Kripke had previously pitched the series to Fox executive Peter Johnson, and when Johnson moved to Wonderland Sound and Vision as president of TV, he contacted Kripke. Johnson soon signed on as co-executive producer, as did Wonderland owner McG as executive producer, with the production company set to make the pilot episode. Before it could be filmed, however, script issues needed to be dealt with. Originally, the brothers were not raised by their father, but rather by their aunt and uncle. Thus, when Dean comes to Sam for assistance in the pilot episode, he has to convince him that the supernatural exists. However, Kripke realized that this made the backstory too complicated and reworked it with Peter Johnson so that their father raised them to be hunters.

The script went through many additional revisions. One of the original ideas was for Sam's girlfriend Jessica to be revealed as a demon, which prompts him to join Dean on the road; however, Kripke felt it was more appropriate for Sam's motivation to be Jessica's death, so he had her killed in the same manner as Sam's mother, making them the "right bookends". Other revised concepts include Sam believing Dean to be a serial killer who murders their father and their father dying in Jessica's place. Filming for the pilot episode was greenlit after director David Nutter, who previously had worked with Kripke on Tarzan, signed on. When the series was eventually picked up, the studio brought in Robert Singer as executive producer, as it wanted Kripke to work with someone with production experience. Due to his previous work on The X-Files, co-executive producer John Shiban was also hired to help design the series mythology. Kripke had the series planned out for three seasons but later expanded it to five and hoped to end it there on a high note.

Writing 

The staff for the first season consisted of Kripke and five other writers, with assistants to help with researching urban legends. Most of the work done in writing the series is very collaborative, with the writers often breaking up into groups. At the beginning of each season, the writers are brought together and pitch their ideas, which are then assigned to a specific writer to be developed. Each story idea is outlined on a dry-erase board, with Kripke and Bob Singer making necessary changes. Afterward, the script is written, and Kripke goes through it to make sure it has the same tone as other episodes. Kripke found this task very difficult to do in the first season, but he felt it became easier by the third season, as the staff came to "really understand the show's style". Following the fifth season, Kripke stepped down as showrunner but maintained his connection with the series as an executive consultant. In a 2016 interview with Collider, he responded to the question as to how involved he still is with the show with the answer, "I would define myself as a proud parent who has sent their child off to college." He elaborated on this analogy, explaining, "I'm there if they need me, I'm happy to help, but I also stay out of their way if they don't need me."

The tone of Supernatural was heavily influenced by films such as Poltergeist—having the horror happen in a family setting rather than remote location—and Evil Dead II and An American Werewolf in London—having bits of comedy mixed in. Commenting on the former, Kripke said, "It's the idea that horror can happen in your own backyard. How many viewers have to worry about the vampire in the gothic castle?" "It's always been a show about family." Other influences include The Two Sisters and Asian horror films The Eye, Ju-on, and Ring.

According to creator Eric Kripke, the show originally was intended to focus on the weekly monsters, with Sam and Dean Winchester merely being "an engine to get us in and out of different horror movies every week". His sole desire was to merely "scare the crap out of people". However, a few episodes in, Kripke and executive producer Bob Singer noticed the onscreen chemistry between Jared Padalecki and Jensen Ackles. This revelation caused them to change the series to focus more on the brothers than the monsters, basing the weekly monster around the storyline they wanted for the Winchesters. According to Kripke, "... sometimes we don't even have the monster until way late in the break, once we get all the angst and the drama done first."

Effects 
Though companies were hired for work on the pilot episode—such as Entity FX for the visual effects—effects departments now work exclusively for the series. Ivan Hayden is the visual effects supervisor, and works with many levels of the production staff. During pre-production, Hayden must go through the scripts, looking for possible visual effects. He then has a concept meeting with the writers, and after settling on the effect designs to use, coordinates with the special effects and stunt departments. Hayden is also present during filming to help the director make sure that the scenes are being filmed in the best way for the visual effects, such as by ensuring that the actors are looking at the correct location where an effect will later be added. Afterward, he then meets with the editors. Another aspect of the visual effects department is coming up with rules and physics for each supernatural creature, though the rules are often bent if it benefits the story. In 2012, it was announced that Hayden would be working at the new Vancouver location of Encore for its VFX division.

Music 
Supernatural features a synthesized orchestral score, although traditional acoustic instruments such as guitars and cellos are used at times. Special instruments have also been used in specific episodes, such as "bluesy gospel music" played on a broken-down piano in the faith-healing episode "Faith". Unlike other television shows, the series features two composers: Christopher Lennertz and Jay Gruska. Each composer scores every other episode, giving them extra time to write the scores, which usually end up being around 30 minutes per episode. They write themes for their own episodes and characters and work with one another if there is overlap between episodes. They try to base the music on the visuals of the episode, such as in the episode "Dead in the Water", in which off-angle shots are accompanied by repetitive and discordant notes, and spoken words such as "water" and "die" are followed by a lower pitch to create a "gurgly" sound. While there are similarities in the scores for situations such as the brothers and their father, about a third of each episode's score is newly written for the series.

While original scores are used throughout episodes, another important aspect of the series' music is the use of classic rock, over which creator Eric Kripke threatened to quit when the network would not allow its inclusion. Most of the songs are from Kripke's private collection, although one of his favorite bands—Led Zeppelin—is too expensive to use. Some episode titles are references to Led Zeppelin songs. The series has featured such bands as Blue Öyster Cult, Bad Company, Stevie Ray Vaughan, Rush, Boston, Triumph and AC/DC on more than one occasion. Multiple songs are usually used throughout each episode, and accompany "The Road So Far" sequences before select episodes that highlight a montage of past events. Although Kripke prefers to keep a fine line between the score and songs used, sometimes Lennertz and Gruska are required to write short sections of rock-like music to fill 15-to-20-second gaps, as it would be too costly to acquire song rights. On the last episode of every season except the first, the song "Carry On Wayward Son" by Kansas is played at the beginning.

Filming locations 
Though the pilot was filmed in Los Angeles, principal filming takes place in Vancouver, British Columbia. Thus, on-location filming usually takes place in the area. "Dead in the Water" was filmed at Buntzen Lake, and the final scenes of "Simon Said" were filmed at Cleveland Dam. Other locations used on the show are often reused two or three times, with the art department making variations to conceal this. Heritage Park in Burnaby has been used as a cemetery in "Red Sky at Morning", and as the location of the gingerbread-house cottage in "Bedtime Stories". Also, Riverview Hospital in Coquitlam has served many functions for the series, including an asylum in "Asylum", a hospital in "In My Time of Dying", and a prison in "Folsom Prison Blues". The episode "Houses of the Holy" was filmed on location in Vancouver at St. Andrew's-Wesley United Church. Because episodes usually take place in the middle of nowhere, filming often takes place at an old military base. Having been shut down for years, the buildings have been removed, leaving just roads on which sets are erected, such as for crossroads scenes.

Online distribution 
Rather than having the series debut on television, The WB instead made the pilot episode available for online streaming through Yahoo! a week before it was set to premiere on the network as part of a promotional scheme. Following the transition to The CW, Supernatural episodes were added to Apple's iTunes Store starting in December 2006, being one of the first CW series to be made available for sale online. The following month, the network began streaming episodes of the series on its website with limited commercial interruption, available for up to four weeks after the initial airings. Beginning January 11, 2007, Australia's Network Ten also began offering full episodes for download via their website, through a deal with Warner Bros. Television. To combat piracy, Ten debuted the second-season premiere five days before its initial broadcast in the country, making Supernatural the first major network show available for free download in Australia before being aired. Subsequent episodes became available online just hours after being televised. Around the same time, episodes were also made available for download on Microsoft's Xbox Live Marketplace. In September 2008, Amazon.com launched its new on-demand TV service, with Supernatural being one of the many television shows available for sale.

Home media

Cast and characters 

The series focuses on the brothers Dean Winchester and Sam Winchester, played by Jensen Ackles and Jared Padalecki, as they travel throughout the country hunting down evil supernatural creatures. Padalecki became interested in the role because he liked horror series, including both The X-Files and The Twilight Zone, which he found similar to the proposed plot of Supernatural. He was also excited to play "the reluctant hero", comparing Sam to The Matrixs Neo and Luke Skywalker of Star Wars. Padalecki had previous experience working with executive producers McG and David Nutter, the former convincing him to audition for the role. Ackles was originally asked by Nutter to audition for the role of Sam but preferred the character of Dean after reading the script. At the time of his audition, he was already a series regular on fellow WB series Smallville. After landing the part of Dean, his Smallville role was cut short.

While the series does not have many lead characters, there are many recurring characters. Jeffrey Dean Morgan portrays John Winchester, father of Sam and Dean. Making an appearance in the pilot episode, John does not return until nearly halfway through the first season, after which he becomes a recurring character until his eventual death in the second season's premiere episode, though his spirit returns to help his sons in the season finale. Later in the series, it is announced that John Winchester fathered a third son with another woman; a half-brother to Sam and Dean. According to writer John Shiban, it was decided early on that John would die. The writers found that having the brothers being separated from their father "split the show". Shiban noted that "... the boys were looking for Dad, and they were looking for a monster of the week, whatever that is, whatever case crosses their path. It became difficult, because we thought it was like – 'what is Dad doing? Is he doing more interesting things than the boys are doing, or what?'" They believed Morgan was initially reluctant about returning to Supernatural for the second season because of his recurring role on the series Grey's Anatomy. Future appearances of the character have been hindered by Morgan's busy schedule.

Also introduced in the first season are the demon Azazel and his unnamed daughter. While Azazel mainly appears merely as shadows or silhouettes in the first season, taking physical form only when he possesses John Winchester, Azazel's daughter uses a girl named Meg Masters—portrayed by Nicki Lynn Aycox—as a host. In the second-season premiere, Azazel's host is portrayed by Fredric Lehne; originally brought on for only one episode, Lehne impressed the showrunners so much that he was asked to return for the season's two-part finale. Even after the character's death, Azazel makes appearances in subsequent seasons, being portrayed by different actors. Lehne also reprises the role in the first episode of season six when Dean is poisoned and begins to see Azazel again. Likewise, after Azazel's daughter is exorcised from Meg towards the end of the first season, the demon and her host continued to appear in the series, although now as two separate characters. Aycox continued her role in the fourth season when the angry spirit of Meg tries to kill the Winchesters. The demon returns for an episode in the second season played by Padalecki, temporarily taking Sam as a host. She appears once again in the fifth season, her newest host being portrayed by Rachel Miner, in a recurring role.

The writers eventually wanted to flesh out the concept of hunters, resulting in the introduction of many new characters. Actor Jim Beaver makes his first appearance as Bobby Singer, an old family friend of the Winchesters, at the end of the first season. Becoming a sort of surrogate father to Sam and Dean after their father's death, the character acts as their mentor and foremost point of contact before his departure in the seventh season. Other hunters appear in the second season with the introduction of Harvelle's Roadhouse, a saloon frequented by hunters. It is owned by Ellen Harvelle (played by Samantha Ferris), whose late husband was a friend of John Winchester. Working alongside her mother is Jo Harvelle (played by Alona Tal). Also present is the computer guy Ash (played by Chad Lindberg), who uses his vast computer skills to track the paranormal. Tal was eventually written out of the series, and believes the reason to be that the producers felt she looked like Sam and Dean's "14-year-old sister". Kripke claims the character was incorrectly conceived, and also cites poor fan reaction for her removal. Also, the character of Ash is killed off in the second-season finale with the destruction of the Roadhouse. Ellen was meant to return in the third season, but the episode had to be scrapped due to the writer's strike. The writers intended for her to be featured in the third-season finale, but Ferris declined because the deal offered to her was not acceptable, as "It could cost [her] money and work". However, both actresses returned as Jo and Ellen in the fifth season.

For the third season, the writers decided to introduce Ruby, a demonic former witch who claims to be an ally to the Winchesters. However, The CW requested that another female be added, so the character Bela Talbot, a self-centered thief who sells occult objects to wealthy clients and who was already intended to appear in multiple episodes, was upgraded to a series regular. Katie Cassidy and Lauren Cohan were eventually cast as Ruby and Bela, respectively, though they originally auditioned for the others' role. Though making only six appearances each in the third season, both actresses were credited as co-stars for their episodes. At the end of the season, Bela was killed off, and Cassidy was let go for budgetary reasons. The role of Ruby was recast for the fourth season, auditions describing the character only as "a love interest". Genevieve Cortese (who later married Padalecki) took over the role until the character's death at the end of the season.

Wanting to bring in Christian mythology to the series, the writers created the angel Castiel. With Kripke wanting to keep the introduction of an angel a secret, the character was instead described as a demon during auditions. Misha Collins was cast as the character. Making his debut in the fourth-season premiere, Castiel resurrects Dean from hell after his death in the third season and comes to be an ally of the Winchesters. The character was originally intended for only a six-episode story arc, but the role was later expanded. Collins was promoted to a series regular for the fifth and sixth season, something Collins believes to be mainly due to fan support. Collins was downgraded to recurring status for the seventh and eighth seasons, but returned to series regular status for seasons nine and ten.

Along with Castiel came other angelic characters, with Robert Wisdom portraying the "militant" and "dogmatic" Uriel, who secretly supports Lucifer; Julie McNiven playing the fallen angel Anna Milton, who eventually regains her angelic form but remains an outcast of Heaven; and Kurt Fuller as Castiel's boss Zachariah, who wishes to start the apocalypse in order to bring Paradise to Earth. Though Wisdom's character is eventually killed, McNiven and Fuller continue their roles into the fifth season and are joined by Mark Pellegrino as the recently released but fallen archangel Lucifer. Pellegrino also appears as Lucifer as a hallucination in Sam's head in season 7. Pellegrino had been the second choice for the role of Castiel and was offered the role of Lucifer without an audition. Further on, Fuller's and McNiven's characters were also killed along with both Harvelle characters.

Season 5 introduces the demon Crowley, played by Mark Sheppard, who would become the Winchester's longest-recurring antagonist and occasional anti-hero in the series. Crowley appears in three episodes of season 5 to help the Winchesters seal Lucifer back in the Cage, believing that once he destroys humanity he will target all demonkind next. In season 6, Crowley becomes the King of Hell and one of the main antagonists working with Castiel to stop Archangel Raphael, the other main antagonist of season 6, from restarting the apocalypse by harnessing the souls of purgatory and splitting the power with Castiel. In season 7, Crowley becomes an antihero who helps the Winchesters against the threat of Leviathans led by Dick Roman after they are released from purgatory by Castiel. Crowley becomes the main antagonist of season 8, attempting to harness the Words of God and their powers and stop the Winchesters from sealing hell forever. In season 9, Crowley becomes an unwilling prisoner of the Winchesters but is forced to deal with Abaddon trying to steal his position as King of Hell. Sheppard was promoted to series regular status for season 10.

Season 7 introduces Kevin Tran the prophet (played by Osric Chau), who translates the word of God to help the Winchesters stop the Leviathans, which leads to their destruction. In season 8, Kevin works to translate another word of God to find the means of sealing hell forever. In season 9, Kevin instead tries to find the means of returning the fallen angels to Heaven but is killed by a Gadreel-possessed Sam.

Also introduced in Season 7 is Charlie Bradbury, a tech-savvy geek (played by Felicia Day) who works at Richard Roman Enterprises. After hacking into Frank's hard drive and learning about the existence of monsters, Charlie becomes an ally of the Winchesters and occasionally helps them out with technical problems and hunts.

Season 9 introduces the angel Gadreel, who originally poses as Ezekiel, played by Tahmoh Penikett and Padalecki. After Sam is seriously injured when he decides not to seal Hell, Gadreel comes to Dean in response to his prayer for help, possesses Sam to heal him, and becomes Dean's ally. However, Gadreel's true identity is later revealed by Metatron to be the guardian who had allowed Lucifer into the Garden of Eden and was imprisoned until the fall. Gadreel then allies with Metatron in an attempt to redeem himself and lead the angels back to Heaven. He kills Kevin Tran and is later expelled from Sam and possesses his original vessel again. However, after Metatron begins sacrificing angels for his plans, Gadreel becomes regretful and joins Sam, Dean, and Castiel.

Season 4 introduces Chuck Shurley as one of God's prophets portrayed by Rob Benedict. Later in season 11, it is revealed that Chuck is God masquerading under the guise of a human to allow angels and mankind free will. In season 15, it is revealed that Chuck is manipulating events in the lives of the Winchesters and their allies for his own perverse amusement and entertainment.

Season 10 introduces the antagonistic witch Rowena MacLeod (portrayed by Ruth Connell), who is later revealed to be the mother of Crowley, who was previously named Fergus. Rowena returns as a sometime ally of the Winchesters throughout seasons 11 to 15, making her one of the long-standing female characters to exist on the show. Rowena's antagonistic and unpredictable nature is redeemable by her sacrifice in season 15 to close hell's portal opened by Chuck.

Season 11 introduces Amara / The Darkness, portrayed by Emily Swallow. The Darkness would later on go on to become an antagonist after being released from imprisonment once the Mark of Cain is broken. The Mark was a seal that kept the Darkness imprisoned in order for God's creation and humanity to survive. Later, it is revealed that the Darkness is a sibling of God.

Season 13 introduces a Nephilim, Jack Kline portrayed by Alexander Calvert as the son of Lucifer. Jack would later on become a member of the Winchester family and an important ally in rescuing the people of Apocalypse World (a world without Winchesters to prevent the endtimes) and defeating Apocalypse World, archangel Michael. Jack would go on to be killed by God as part of Chuck's plan only to be resurrected by Billie, a reaper who is a newly turned replacement for Death.

Because the show focuses mainly on the two Winchester brothers, the writers realized that viewers would know that the characters are not in danger of being permanently killed. To fix this, the staff often writes in guest characters to give tension to the episode, occasionally having them die.

Synopsis

Season 1 

The first season consists of 22 episodes. It premiered on The WB on September 13, 2005, and concluded on May 4, 2006. The first 16 episodes aired on Tuesdays at 9:00 pm, after which the series was rescheduled to Thursdays at 9:00 pm.

After their father goes missing during a "hunting trip," Dean Winchester tracks down his brother Sam at Stanford University and they begin to live a life on the road, in Dean's black 1967 Chevrolet Impala. However, their father is not a typical hunter: he hunts supernatural creatures like ghosts, vampires, and spirits, and has trained his sons to do the same. Along the way, Sam and Dean save innocent people, fight creatures and ghosts, and collect clues to their father's whereabouts.

Season 2 

The second season consists of 22 episodes, and it aired on Thursdays at 9:00 pm on The CW, beginning September 28, 2006, and ending May 17, 2007.

Sam and Dean continue to hunt the demon Azazel. Part of Azazel's master plan is revealed as he gathers Sam and others with similar psychic abilities to fight each other, leading to Sam's death. Dean makes a deal with a crossroads demon to bring Sam back in exchange for his soul, which will be collected in one year and taken to Hell. With the help of the spirit of John Winchester, Dean kills Azazel and the portal is closed.

Season 3 

The third season consists of 16 episodes that aired on Thursdays at 9:00 pm beginning October 4, 2007, and ending May 15, 2008. Originally 22 episodes were ordered for the third season, but production was halted on December 5, 2007, upon completion of the twelfth episode by the 2007–08 Writers Guild of America strike. The season number was shortened to sixteen episodes, with four new episodes airing in April and May 2008.

The season focuses on trying to save Dean from his deal and tracking down the demons that were released from hell. The brothers learn which demon holds Dean's contract: a powerful demon named Lilith. The brothers, along with Ruby, track Lilith down and attempt to kill her. Lilith is unable to stop Sam on account of his mysterious abilities; however, Dean's contract expires and his soul is taken to Hell.

Season 4 

The fourth season consists of 22 episodes that aired on Thursdays at 9:00 pm beginning September 18, 2008, and ending May 14, 2009.

Dean is rescued from hell and brought back by an angel of the Lord named Castiel. The rest of the season follows the brothers as they work with Castiel to stop Lilith's plan of breaking the 66 seals, which would allow the fallen archangel Lucifer to walk the Earth free once again. Dean escapes and tries to stop Sam after learning that Lilith is, in fact, the last seal, but Sam kills her anyway, breaking open Lucifer's prison. Ruby reveals her true colors as a demon loyal to Lucifer, and Dean kills her. As the season ends, Lucifer's cage opens and he escapes from hell.

Season 5 

The fifth season consists of 22 episodes that aired on Thursdays at 9:00 pm beginning September 10, 2009, and ending May 13, 2010. This season was rumored to be the last season, but Padalecki and Ackles had contracts for a sixth season, and The CW renewed it on February 16, 2010.

The fifth season revolves around the fight to stop Lucifer and save the world from the Apocalypse. In the end, Sam throws himself and Adam into the Cage to trap Lucifer once more. Castiel is resurrected by God and returns to heaven to restore order. Dean returns to his old girlfriend Lisa to live a normal life. Sam is mysteriously freed of the Cage.

Season 6 

The sixth season consists of 22 episodes that aired on Fridays at 9:00 pm beginning September 24, 2010, and ending May 20, 2011. Beginning with this season, Kripke left as showrunner, leaving executive producer Sera Gamble to take over the reins.

Sam and Dean are forced to work to capture Alpha monsters for Crowley. Dean discovers that Sam's soul is still in the Cage, so he implores the Horseman Death to retrieve it. The brothers discover Castiel has orchestrated all of these events from behind the scenes and was working with Crowley the entire time. Castiel proceeds with his plan, absorbing all the souls from purgatory and pronouncing himself God.

Season 7 

The seventh season consists of 23 episodes that aired on Fridays at 9:00 pm beginning September 23, 2011, and ending May 18, 2012.

After declaring himself God, Castiel unwittingly releases the Leviathans, ravenous creatures who feed on human flesh. Sam and Dean must work to stop the Leviathans and their leader Dick Roman. The brothers learn that the only way to kill the Leviathans is with the "bone of a righteous mortal washed in the three bloods of the fallen". Dean and Castiel kill Dick but are dragged into purgatory as a result, while Sam is left alone to deal with Crowley, who plans to rise to power.

Season 8 

The eighth season consists of 23 episodes that aired on Wednesdays at 9:00 pm beginning October 3, 2012, and ending May 15, 2013.

The two brothers begin a fight against Crowley to find the Demon Tablet and trap all demons in Hell. Kevin Tran translates three trials that must be completed in order to lock the Gates of Hell for good, but although Sam completed the first two, Dean ends the trials before the third can be finished as completing the trials would kill Sam. Castiel is tricked by the angel Metatron into banishing every angel apart from Metatron to Earth.

Season 9 

The ninth season consists of 23 episodes that aired on Tuesdays at 9:00 pm beginning October 8, 2013, and ending May 20, 2014.

The brothers search for a way to return the angels to Heaven. The angel Gadreel murders Kevin Tran and escapes to join Metatron. Sam expels Gadreel, but the experience causes Sam and Dean to split up. Castiel begins a search of his own for Metatron, believing him to be the key to reversing the expulsion of the angels. Metatron begins trying to unite all the angels under his rule while Castiel leads other angels against him to retake heaven. Castiel defeats Metatron after a repentant Gadreel sacrifices himself. Metatron kills Dean, causing Dean to become a demon.

Season 10 

The tenth season consists of 23 episodes that aired beginning on October 7, 2014, and ended on May 20, 2015. The season began airing Tuesdays at 9:00 pm, and moved to Wednesdays at 9:00 pm beginning March 18, 2015.

Dean is now a demon, working alongside Crowley. Meanwhile, Sam continues to search for Dean. After Dean refuses to follow Crowley's order and embarrasses him in front of his demon followers, Crowley gives Sam his brother's location. Sam and Castiel cure Dean by using sanctified human blood. A mysterious new witch comes into play, revealed to be Crowley's mother, Rowena.

A large focus of the season is Dean's quest to overcome the Mark of Cain and have it removed if possible. New hope for ridding Dean of the Mark comes when Charlie unearths the Book of the Damned.

Season 11 

In the eleventh season, Sam and Dean deal with the release of Amara / The Darkness. When nothing works to get rid of the Darkness, Amara claims that God must appear Himself to see her destroying everything He created and loves. Chuck returns and tells Metatron he is God. Amara and Chuck reconcile and leave the Earth, but not before Amara tells Dean she is going to give him what he wants most for helping her: a reunion with his mother.

Season 12 

The twelfth season premiered on October 13, 2016, and concluded on May 18, 2017, consisting of 23 episodes.

Lucifer makes the President of the United States his human vessel. The president gets his assistant Kelly Kline pregnant and Kelly gives birth to the Nephilim, while Crowley sacrifices himself to kill Lucifer. Crowley and Castiel die trying to kill Lucifer, while Mary and Lucifer are pulled into the rift created by the Nephilim's birth. Sam is shocked to see Jack the Nephilim grown into a teenager.

Season 13 

The thirteenth season premiered on October 12, 2017, and concluded on May 17, 2018, consisting of 23 episodes.

Dean and Sam are left to 'raise' Jack. Sam is willing to give the boy a chance, while Dean is concerned due to his heritage. As Jack sides with Mary and the humans against the angels, the Winchesters and Castiel gather the ingredients for a spell to open the portal to hell while Lucifer tries to reestablish himself as king of heaven. Dean kills Lucifer, but the season ends with Michael taking control of Dean's body.

Season 14 

The fourteenth season premiered on October 11, 2018, and concluded on April 25, 2019, consisting of 20 episodes.
 
Michael begins experimenting with monsters, making them immune to their former weaknesses. Dean, Sam, Castiel and Jack decide to take down Michael and his army of monsters once and for all, but Michael retakes control of Dean and unleashes his monsters on the city. God returns and tells the boys that they must use a gun that he built to kill Jack, but Sam and Dean refuse. Angered at their defiance, God smites Jack and unleashes every vengeful spirit from Hell back on Earth.

Season 15 

The fifteenth and final season premiered on October 10, 2019. The season consisted of 20 episodes and aired on Thursdays at 8:00 pm (ET) with the exception of two episodes in March 2020 which aired on Mondays at 8:00 pm. The series finale was scheduled to air on May 18, 2020. In March 2020, Warner Bros. Television shut down production on the series due to the COVID-19 pandemic. Later in March, showrunner Andrew Dabb revealed that the series would go on hiatus after the March 23 episode. The season resumed airing on October 8, and the series finale aired on November 19, 2020.

Recurring elements

Impala 
Throughout the series, Dean drives a black 1967 Chevrolet Impala which he refers to as "Baby". Having been passed down to him by his father (John), it is Dean's most prized possession, with actor Jensen Ackles feeling it is Dean's "life" and "sanctuary". The brothers travel in it throughout the country as they hunt the supernatural, and the trunk holds various weaponry and their fake IDs. In the first two seasons, it has a Kansas license plate with the number KAZ 2Y5, a reference to the Winchesters' home state of Kansas, and the series premiere date of 2005. Towards the end of the second season, the car sports a new Ohio license plate (CNK 80Q3) to aid the brothers in hiding from the FBI.

All of the cars used in the show are stock 1967 Chevrolet Impala four door hardtops. They feature Chevrolet small-block engines, recolored interiors, custom seats, and nonfunctioning radios. Other than the one used in the original, all of the Impalas had to be painted black for the series. One of the Impalas used features a detachable roof and doors for up-close shots, and is capable of being separated in half. After filming of the series concluded, Ackles was allowed by Warner Bros. and The CW to keep the main Impala.

The Colt 

The 1836 Colt Paterson revolver, usually referred to simply as "the Colt", was made by Samuel Colt, a paranormal hunter. According to legend, anything shot by this gun, using one of its thirteen original bullets, will die, including creatures normally immune to any and all weapons.

The gun used in the series is actually a replica Paterson modified to fire metallic cartridges. The gun was described as being built in 1835, before Colt made firearms, and fires metallic cartridges, which were never made to fire in a Colt revolver until 10 years after Samuel Colt's death. On the barrel of the gun is inscribed the Latin phrase non-timebo mala, meaning "I will fear no evil". On the grip is a carving of a pentagram, with much of the finish removed to give it an aged appearance. The prop department also has a rubber version of the Colt to be used in fight scenes for pistol-whipping.

Ruby's knife 
Ruby possesses a mysterious and presumably magical demon-killing knife, which Kripke refers to as "a hand-to-hand version of the Colt". Its handle is made of elk antlers, and the knife has engravings on both sides of the blade, although the symbols are all nonsensical. It has been seen and used many times following its introduction in the third season. Creator Eric Kripke doubted that how the knife functions would ever be revealed, stating, "I like to leave some things mysterious. And that's likely to remain mysterious." However, the eighth season reveals it to be "an ancient demon-killing knife of the Kurds".

Other media

Promotion and tie-ins 
The advertisements The WB chose for the show went beyond just commercials and billboards. Before the series debuted, the network placed signs for the show at gas station pumps, and gave out rubber glow-in-the-dark bracelets at New York and Los Angeles movie theaters. Also, coffee cup sleeves revealed the image of a "terrified woman seemingly pinned to a ceiling" when heated were distributed to 500 cafes throughout New York, Chicago, and Los Angeles. The same image was used in special mirrors the network installed in almost 200 nightclubs throughout three cities in order to reach "young, hip horror fans". Additional advertisements were also placed in bars, movie theaters, and video game stores, with hundreds of the bars also receiving Supernatural napkins and coasters.

The series also has many real-life tie-ins. The urban legend website Hellhounds Lair featured in the season one episode "Hell House" was a real website set up by the show's producers. As a tie-in to the sequel episode "Ghostfacers", in which the owners of Hellhounds Lair create their own Ghost Hunters-style reality show, The CW set up Ghostfacers.com. The Winchesters later visit this website in the fourth-season episode "It's a Terrible Life". Series tie-ins, however, extend beyond the internet. For a time, Dean's cell number—revealed in the first-season episode "Phantom Traveler" to be 1–866–907–3235—was a real number, with Jensen Ackles reading the message: "This is Dean Winchester. If this is an emergency, leave a message. If you are calling about 11–2–83, page me with your coordinates." The second-season episode "Tall Tales" featured a tie-in to that week's issue of the tabloid newspaper Weekly World News. The February 19 and March 19, 2007, editions of the paper featured exclusive interviews with Sam and Dean, the articles being written by Paul Kupperberg.

Merchandise 
Supernatural has a vast amount of merchandise available, including calendars, T-shirts, shot glasses, temporary tattoos and posters. Inkworks has released trading cards for the show, some cards featuring actors' autographs and swatches from actual costumes used on the series.

The Supernatural Role Playing Game (a pen-and-paper role-playing game) was developed by Margaret Weis Productions, Ltd. Originally scheduled for release in October 2007, it was delayed until August 2009. The game uses material from the series, novels, and comics. Additionally, on September 7, 2010, Watertower Music released Supernatural: Original Television Soundtrack – Seasons 1–5. It features 18 original tracks by Supernatural series composers Christopher Lennertz and Jay Gruska. Funko has also released three Pop! form figures of Dean, Sam, and Castiel as of November 21, 2013.

Further information on the series' mythology and production have been detailed through print. Official companion guides for the first six seasons have been released, all written by Nicholas Knight and published by Titan Books. Two additional guides written by Alex Irvine, The "Supernatural" Book of Monsters, Spirits, Demons, and Ghouls and John Winchester's Journal, have been published by It Books. Irvine's books function as resource guides that contain illustrations and detailed descriptions of the supernatural creatures the Winchester family has encountered, giving additional background on creatures and mythology featured on the show. Premiering on November 27, 2007, was the Official Supernatural Magazine. Published by Titan Magazines, it contains series information and exclusive cast and crew interviews. It Books published Supernatural: Bobby Singer's Guide to Hunting by David Reed on September 6, 2011, sharing all the knowledge that the character Bobby Singer had to share about hunting, the Winchesters, and other knowledge he picked up over the years dealing with the elements of the supernatural.

Comics 
The series has also developed an expanded universe. Three six-issue comic book miniseries have been published by WildStorm, a company under the DC Comics umbrella. Supernatural: Origins depicts the early lives of John, Sam, and Dean Winchester, and shows how John became a hunter. Supernatural: Rising Son, "a dysfunctional family story", details Dean as he begins following in his father's footsteps. While Kripke was heavily involved with the first series, the writer's strike prevented him from doing so with Rising Son. Supernatural: Beginning's End deals with "the definitive events that led to Sam leaving his family to attend Stanford".

A fourth miniseries, Caledonia (named Supernatural: The Dogs of Edinburgh in the UK), by Brian Wood and Grant Bond, dealt with Sam Winchester's trip to the United Kingdom during the Stanford years. The first two miniseries were written by Peter Johnson, one of the series co-executive producer, while the third one is by television series writers Andrew Dabb and Daniel Loflin.

Novels 
Several novels based on the series have also been published.

Secondary literature 
An unofficial anthology titled In the Hunt: Unauthorized Essays on Supernatural was released on February 10, 2009, by Smart Pop and featured essays covering different aspects of both the series and its fanbase. The Mythology of Supernatural: The Signs and Symbols Behind the Popular TV Show, published by Berkley Trade on August 2, 2011, sought to explore the religious and mythological roots of the show. And on October 1, 2011, ECW Press released the book TV Goes to Hell: An Unofficial Road Map of Supernatural which explored topics such as folklore, religion, gender and sexuality, comedy, and music through essays from a number of contributors.

Spin-off series

Ghostfacers 
After their first season debut in "Hell House" (episode 17 written by Trey Callaway), the growing popularity of "amateur spook-hunters" Ed Zeddmore and Harry Spangler prompted Kripke to consider a spin-off series for the characters. He discussed the idea of an online venture with actors A. J. Buckley and Travis Wester, and held a successful meeting with studio and network executives. Though Kripke announced their plans to produce "some new material, either webisodes, potentially cell phone content or basically an off-network Ghostfacers series" at the 2008 Comic-Con, the economic downturn delayed production until 2009.

Buckley and Wester, along with Patrick J. Doody and Chris Valenziano, penned the series. They found the format—ten three-minute segments—difficult to manage because each webisode has to work both individually and as part of the overall storyline. However, Wester noted, "We couldn't get too indulgent, we couldn't delve into long conversations. That helps not only with the storytelling but with the comedy... With drama, it takes time to establish an emotional connection with the characters. With comedy, you can jump right in."

Though an initial idea of Kripke's involved the cast searching real haunted houses, the first season instead features the Ghostfacers investigating a haunted theater. The series also stars Brittany Ishibashi as Maggie and Austin Basis as Spruce.

In August 2011, a webisode was released online in which the Ghostfacers meet Castiel.

Supernatural: The Anime Series 
On June 9, 2010, the official Japanese Warner Bros. website announced an anime version of the series titled Supernatural: The Animation (スーパーナチュラル・ザ・アニメーション), which debuted in Japan in January 2011 and is produced by Japanese anime studio Madhouse. Shigeyuki Miya and Atsuko Ishizuka are co-directors for the series, with Kripke credited as the project creator. Madhouse co-founder Masao Maruyama serves as executive producer, with Naoya Takayama supervising the scripts and Takahiro Yoshimatsu designing the characters. Yūya Uchida and Hiroki Touchi, who voice Sam and Dean for the Japanese dub of the live-action series, reprise their roles.

The anime's first season consists of 22 half-hour episodes; while the storyline covers the first two seasons of the live-action series, it also includes original content exploring the Winchesters' childhoods and expanding upon secondary characters. Warner Home Video released the first two episodes on Blu-ray and DVD in Japan on January 12, 2011; episodes 3 through 12 shipped on February 2, and the rest on April 6. Warner Home Video released the Blu-ray and DVD box sets of the anime series on July 26, 2011, in North America.

Jared Padalecki voices Sam in the English-language version of the series, while Jensen Ackles voices Dean only in the last two episodes for scheduling reasons; Andrew Farrar voices Dean in English for the first 20 episodes.

Supernatural: Bloodlines 

On July 22, 2013, The CW announced there was a spin-off of Supernatural in the works, with the 20th episode of season nine serving as a back-door pilot. On January 29, 2014, it was revealed that the spin-off was to have been titled Supernatural: Bloodlines.

The backdoor pilot was written by Andrew Dabb and directed by Robert Singer. The series was going to set to explore the "clashing hunter and monster cultures in Chicago". The show was not picked up by the CW for the 2014–2015 season. However, the network has remained open to another spin-off of the series.

Samuel Colt 
During production of Supernaturals third season, Kripke stated that the writers sometimes discussed the possibility of a prequel series. Set in the Old West, the spin-off would follow Samuel Colt and a group of hunters.

Wayward Sisters 
On June 20, 2017, it was announced that Wayward Sisters, a spin-off series starring Kim Rhodes as Sheriff Jody Mills, was being developed by Supernatural writer-producers Andrew Dabb and Robert Berens, along with Robert Singer and Phil Sgriccia. The spin-off debuted as a backdoor pilot during the thirteenth season of Supernatural. In May 2018, it was confirmed that the series was not picked up.

The Winchesters 

In May 2022, the CW ordered The Winchesters, a prequel series that focuses on Sam and Dean's parents, John and Mary. The series is executive produced by Jensen Ackles, his wife Danneel Ackles (who portrayed Anael on the series), and Supernatural writer Robbie Thompson. Ackles reprises his role as Dean Winchester as the narrator. It premiered on October 11, 2022.

Podcast 
An official rewatch podcast titled Supernatural: Then and Now debuted on January 24, 2022, and is hosted by Rob Benedict and Richard Speight Jr., who played Chuck and Gabriel on the series. On the podcast, they revisit the show and interview cast and crew members to share behind-the-scenes information. Jensen Ackles and Jared Padalecki guest starred on the first two episodes.

Impact

Ratings
Seasonal rankings (based on average total viewers per episode) of Supernatural on The WB and The CW (some including repeats).

After the first four episodes of Supernatural aired in 2005, the WB decided to pick up the series for a full season of 22 episodes. During those first episodes, the series was ranked third in males aged 18–34 and 12–34. It also posted an increase of 73% in males aged 18–49 from the year before, although it only gained 4% in total viewers, and retained 91% of viewers from its lead-in, Gilmore Girls. Supernatural had low ratings during its second season, with viewers consisting mainly of teen girls, and the CW trying to attract more male viewers. The show's future was in doubt at the end of the second season. Despite mediocre ratings in the previous year, it was back for a third season. Although its third season's rating were low, it did well with viewers aged 18–49. In this category, it ranked eighth of all returning series broadcast by a major network. The show received an early pickup for its fourth season. The show's ratings increased in its fourth season. The fourth-season premiere aired on September 18, 2008, averaging its highest rating ever since its debut on The CW with 3.96 million viewers, a 33% surge over the season three premiere and a 1.7/5 in adults 18–49, up 42% from one year earlier. On October 16, 2008, the show was watched by 3.06 million viewers, making the lowest rating for the season. On October 30, 2008, the show climbed to its best performance in adults 18–34 (1.4/4), adults 18–49 (1.5/4) and total viewers (3.6mil) since its season premiere on September 18, 2008. For the fifth-season premiere, viewership increased by 6% in women 18–34 (1.7/5) over the fourth-season premiere. However, taking DVR viewings into account with new Live-Plus 7 Day data, total viewership for the premiere increased 38%, with women 18–34 increasing by 35% and adults 18–34 by 47%.

According to Nielsen ratings, Supernatural placed sixth and seventh in 2020 and 2021, respectively, in the rankings of the most-watched acquired streaming series in the United States. It had 20.3 billion minutes watched in 2020 and 18.9 billion in 2021. For 2022, it placed eighth for most-watched acquired streaming series and eleventh for most-watched streaming series overall, with 18.8 billion minutes watched.

Awards and nominations

Reception 

During its first season, the show received generally mixed critical reception, but the reception from critics has grown more favorable as the series progressed with subsequent seasons receiving generally positive reviews from critics.

The first season received a Metacritic score of 59 out of 100 based on 22 reviews, indicating "mixed or average reviews". The review aggregator website Rotten Tomatoes reported an 87% approval rating for the first season, with an average rating of 7.32/10 based on 31 reviews. The website's consensus reads, "Despite some too-hip dialogue and familiar thematic elements, Supernaturals vigilante brothers manage to stir up some legitimate scares." Tanner Stransky of Entertainment Weekly gave the first season a B, saying the show "comes off as weekly installments of a horror movie series", but that "Adding to the show's cred are the '67 Chevy Impala the boys rumble around in and their kick-ass soundtrack". Jeff Swindoll of Monsters and Critics "really liked" the first season for its "horrific content and the brotherly chemistry between its two stars". He also noted that the season finished "with one bang of a cliffhanger". Swindoll enjoyed the second season, too, saying that it "still works thanks to the brotherly chemistry between Padalecki and Ackles" and noted the second season focused more on the show's mythology.

Swindoll also liked the third season, saying "Eric Kripke must've sold his soul to the devil so that the show wouldn't suffer a third season slump." He also enjoyed the moments featuring Bobby Singer (Jim Beaver), likening him to the character Cooter from Dukes of Hazzard. However, Daniel Bettridge of Den of Geek believed that the writer's strike hindered the season, with many issues being left unresolved and the finale feeling "a little rushed". He also felt that new characters Ruby (Katie Cassidy) and Bela (Lauren Cohan) were "disappointingly unexplored and ineffectively used". While Diana Steenbergen of IGN liked that there was a season-long story arc with Dean's demonic deal, she believed that viewers would know that the pact would not be resolved until the finale, making the self-enclosed episodes feel like they are "treading water, waiting for the main storyline to resume". In 2008, AOL TV placed the show on its list of TV's Biggest Guilty Pleasures.

Another Monsters and Critics reviewer, June L., gave the fourth season a positive review, saying the show "remains intriguing and entertaining, giving viewers much to ponder in terms of the philosophical analysis of the nature of good and evil." Steenbergen felt that the series made a transition from a "pretty good show to being a pretty great show". She praised Misha Collins for his portrayal of the angel Castiel and felt that the interactions between Dean and Castiel were "one of the highlights of the season". Before the premiere of the fifth season, Rolling Stone listed the series as one of "The 50 Best Reasons to Watch TV", citing Sam and Dean Winchester as the "Bo and Luke Duke of demon hunting".

The Chicago Tribunes Maureen Ryan named Supernatural among the top ten shows of 2009, stating that the "thoughtfully crafted show got bolder and more creative in 2009, coming up with hilarious and innovative episodes and taking risks with its storytelling." Mike Hale of The New York Times also named the series on his top ten list for the year: "Supernatural is currently among the wildest and most entertaining series in prime time." In 2010, AOL TV ranked Supernatural fourth of the Top 20 Magic/Supernatural Shows of All Time, noting that the show had been compared to The X-Files early in its run before "distinguishing itself as a unique, unpredictable and addictive series that not only features monsters, magic and Lucifer himself, but also boasts a dynamic duo arguably better at the banter than Mulder and Scully -- Sam and Dean Winchester".

In 2012, Entertainment Weekly listed the show at No. 19 in the "25 Best Cult TV Shows from the Past 25 Years", saying, "Supernatural began with a pretty straightforward premise – hot guys kill spooky things – but it didn't stay that way for long. The characters have literally been to hell and back, and along the way, they have woven a complicated and compelling mythology filled with friends (angel Castiel), recurring foes (demon Crowley), and inside jokes (Wincest!). Supernatural has also, however, dedicated episodes to mocking the sillier aspects of its own existence, like its hypercritical fandom. This self-referential approach has rewarded longtime viewers and helped build a community so passionate, it's almost scary." The show has a broad demographic base and is more popular in Russia than the US.

Syndication 
On January 4, 2010, the cable television network TNT began airing reruns of Supernatural. In Canada, the series has been syndicated on Space, Dusk, ABC Spark, M3, and E!.

Fandom and popular culture 

Being a cult series, Supernatural has garnered a dedicated fanbase. They are active online, and many have written fanfiction stories about the show, ranging from Wincest (the romantic pairing of brothers Dean and Sam Winchester) to Destiel (the romantic pairing of Dean Winchester and Castiel) to various other character pairings. The writers have referenced this several times in the series, including the 200th episode, which makes references to Wincest, Destiel, and Sastiel (the romantic pairing of Sam Winchester and Castiel).

The first fan conventions dedicated to Supernatural took place in Nashville, Tennessee, in October 2006 and in London in May 2007, and conventions have since expanded through to Germany and throughout the United States. The series' stars and large guest cast make appearances, with fans from the United States, Europe, China, and Australia attending.

Before the debut of the series' fifth season, in which Lucifer is finally freed from his imprisonment, fans attempted to promote the show through Twitter. Enough fans posted the hashtag "#LuciferIsComing" that it made it into "trending topics"—a list depicting words and phrases posted with the highest frequency on the website. However, Twitter users who were unaware of the fans' intentions responded with numerous posts of "#GodIsHere", and the topic was blocked from Twitter's trending topics after complaints. Actor Misha Collins, who portrays Castiel in the series, tried to continue the campaign by requesting that fans post "#PDiddyIsScaredOfHisTV", rapper P. Diddy being the one whom many fans believe to be the instigator of the initial backlash. However, after an hour, this attempt to trend the topic was also stymied by Twitter.

In honor of the series' season 14 renewal, Mayor Steve Adler of Austin, Texas, declared June 23, 2018, as "Supernatural Day" in the city, as the show's stars Ackles and Padalecki are both Austin residents. The day, which coincided with the duo participating in local charity events, also recognized Supernatural for, as the declaration proclaimed, "bringing the best fans in the world" to the city.

The series's fandom gave rise to a new subgenre of erotic fan fiction and then to a subgenre of speculative erotic fiction in its own right, the "Omegaverse". Works in this genre feature humans with a wolf-like social structure and sexual behavior.

Notes

References

Further reading

External links 

 
 

 
2000s American drama television series
2000s American horror television series
2000s American supernatural television series
2005 American television series debuts
2010s American drama television series
2010s American horror television series
2010s American supernatural television series
2020 American television series endings
2020s American drama television series
2020s American horror television series
2020s American supernatural television series
American fantasy drama television series
Television series about angels
Apocalyptic television series
Television series about demons
Television series about personifications of death
Fiction about the Devil
English-language television shows
Fiction about God
Television shows about exorcism
Television series about ghosts
Television about magic
Mythology in popular culture
Occult detective fiction
Religious drama television series
Television series about brothers
Television series by Warner Bros. Television Studios
Television series by Wonderland Sound and Vision
Television shows set in the United States
The CW original programming
The WB original programming
Television series about families
Television series about vampires
Television series about werewolves
Television series about witchcraft
Television series created by Eric Kripke
Fiction about purgatory
Metafictional television series
Television shows filmed in Vancouver